Henry Woodward may refer to:

 Henry Woodward (colonist) (c. 1646–c. 1690), first British colonist of colonial South Carolina
 Henry Woodward (English actor) (1714–1777), interpreter of Parolles in All's Well That Ends Well
 Henry Woodward (geologist) (1832–1921), English geologist and president of the Geological Society of London
 Henry Woodward (inventor), Canadian inventor and pioneer in the development of the incandescent lamp
 Henry Woodward (American actor) (1882–1953), performer in The Last of the Mohicans
 Henry Woodward (Australian politician) (1898–1966), member of the New South Wales Legislative Assembly
 Harry Page Woodward (1858–1917), British-born Australian geologist, mining engineer and public servant